The word equestrian is a reference to equestrianism, or horseback riding, derived from Latin  and , "horse".

Horseback riding (or Riding in British English)
Examples of this are:
Equestrian sports
Equestrian order, one of the upper classes in ancient Rome
Equestrian statue, a statue of a leader on horseback
Equestrian nomads, one of various nomadic or semi-nomadic ethnic groups whose culture places special emphasis on horse breeding and riding
Equestrian at the Summer Olympics, a division of Olympic Games competition

Other 
The ship Equestrian, used to transport convicts from England to Australia, for example Alfred Dancey.

See also 
Equestria, Pretoria
Equestria, the fictional nation in which the television show My Little Pony: Friendship Is Magic, and its associated comic books, movies, and novels primarily take place